Tarek Nour Communications is a global marketing and communications company headquartered in Giza, Egypt. It is one of the largest advertising agencies in the Middle East.  

When founded in 1979 by Tarek Nour, the company was the first private advertising agency operating in Egypt.

About The Founder
Tarek Nour, born in 1945 in Cairo, he is the Chairman of the Board of Directors of Tarek Nour Telecommunications Company. 

The agency was awarded several Awards in recognition of creativity, initiative, excellence, and outstanding contributions in the media and advertising industry.

References

External links
Official Website
Instagram Likes
Social Media Promotion

Advertising agencies of Egypt
Mass media companies of Egypt
Egyptian companies established in 1979
Mass media companies established in 1979
Business services companies established in 1979